"Rainbow Connection" is a song from the 1979 film The Muppet Movie, with music and lyrics written by Paul Williams and Kenneth Ascher. The song was performed by Jim Henson – as Kermit the Frog – in the film. "Rainbow Connection" reached No. 25 on the Billboard Hot 100 in November 1979, with the song remaining in the Top 40 for seven weeks total. Williams and Ascher received an Academy Award nomination for Best Original Song at the 52nd Academy Awards. 

In 2020, "Rainbow Connection" was deemed "culturally, historically, or aesthetically significant" by the Library of Congress and selected for preservation in the National Recording Registry.

Production
Williams and Ascher, who had previously collaborated on several songs for the 1976 film A Star Is Born, were tasked with writing the songs for The Muppet Movie. For the song that became "Rainbow Connection", Jim Henson told them that the opening scene should feature Kermit the Frog by himself, singing and playing the banjo. Williams and Ascher wrote most of the song fairly quickly at Williams's house, but got stuck trying to think of appropriate words for the part in the chorus that eventually became the phrase "the rainbow connection"; they were looking for a way to tie in the chorus to the song's theme of rainbows. As they sat down for dinner with Williams's then-wife, Kate Clinton, they explained to her their predicament of looking for a phrase that would provide "a rainbow connection", then realized, in the course of explaining the problem to her, that the phrase "the rainbow connection" would itself be a good fit. Williams and Ascher used "When You Wish Upon a Star" from Pinocchio as inspiration for the song.

Williams has said that his favorite lyrics in the song are "Who said that every wish/ Would be heard and answered/ When wished on the morning star?/ Somebody thought of that/ And someone believed it/ Look what it's done so far", because they imply that "there's power in your thoughts". He also noted that the lyrical phrasing was written weirdly with Kermit's speech patterns in mind.

Critical reception and awards
Allmusic described "Rainbow Connection" as an "unlikely radio hit ... which Kermit the Frog sings with all the dreamy wistfulness of a short, green Judy Garland" and went on to add that "'Rainbow Connection' serves the same purpose in The Muppet Movie that "Over the Rainbow" served in The Wizard of Oz, with nearly equal effectiveness: an opening establishment of the characters' driving urge for something more in life." Others have similarly referred to "Rainbow Connection" as the film's "I Want" song.

Ascher and Williams received Oscar nominations at the 52nd Academy Awards for the score of The Muppet Movie and for "Rainbow Connection", which was nominated for Best Original Song. The score lost to Bob Fosse's All That Jazz. The song lost to "It Goes Like It Goes" from Norma Rae, a win that some critics denounced.

Legacy and other Muppet renditions
The song's name has been used by a number of charitable organizations wishing to evoke its message, including a children's charity similar to the Make-A-Wish Foundation, a summer camp for seriously ill children, and a horseriding camp for people with disabilities. The name's influence can also be seen from business names to artificial Christmas tree products.

The American Film Institute named "Rainbow Connection" the 74th greatest movie song of all time in AFI's 100 Years...100 Songs.

Kermit the Frog reprised the song on The Muppet Show in 1981 as a duet with Debbie Harry when she was a guest star. Jeff Moss and Ralph Burns also quoted the song's intro as the intro to the instrumental, "carriage ride" rendition of "Together Again" that segued into the Muppet Babies song sequence, "I'm Gonna Always Love You" in The Muppets Take Manhattan (1984). The song is also reprised by a large group of Muppets as the closing number in the 1985 special The Muppets: A Celebration of 30 Years. 

Kermit reprises the song in the 2011 film The Muppets, this time as a duet with Miss Piggy that leads into the entire Muppet group singing together. A shorter version of the song performed by tribute band "The Moopets", along with Fozzie Bear, is also used in the film. The iTunes release of The Muppets soundtrack included a new version of the song as an exclusive bonus track, recorded by Steve Whitmire, the then-current performer of Kermit. The song was also reprised in the TV series The Muppets, in the 2015 episode "Pig's in a Blackout".

In 1996 in Whanganui, New Zealand, a 21-year-old man burst into the radio station Star FM and took the manager hostage, demanding that Kermit the Frog's rendition of the song be played.

On September 24, 2011, the town of Leland, Mississippi, changed the name of a local bridge to "The Rainbow Connection" in honor of Henson on what would have been his 75th birthday. Henson had lived in Leland and played near that bridge as a child.

On April 25, 2020, Kermit released a new performance of the song (recorded by Matt Vogel) on social media to lift spirits during the COVID-19 pandemic.

On January 14, 2022, during Epcot's Festival of the Arts, Spaceship Earth was joined by The Muppets in singing Rainbow Connection.

Charts

Year-end charts

Other versions
The following artists have also recorded the song:

Appearances in other media
 The song was featured in the 1994 episode "Cold Spell" of the TV show Picket Fences.
 The Carpenters cover of "Rainbow Connection" was used as the opening theme for the 2001 TBS Japanese TV drama Koi ga shitai Koi ga shitai Koi ga shitai.
 In the 2006 episode "The Convict" of the television show The Office, Ed Helms sings "Rainbow Connection".
 Paul Williams performed the song on the preschool show Yo Gabba Gabba! in the 2008 episode "Weather".
 The television show Legion featured the song in a 2017 episode.
 In the 2021 episode "Juice Box" (season two episode 8) of Mythic Quest, the Willie Nelson version of the song was played at the end, alongside Charlotte Nicdao singing.
 The 2022 episode "Walk of Faith" (season two episode 4) of the Netflix show Sweet Magnolias features a duet of "Rainbow Connection" with both Katie and Ty on guitar.
 On October 26, 2022, on Season 8 of The Masked Singer, Kermit was joined by Nicole Scherzinger, Robin Thicke, Ken Joeng, Nick Cannon, and Jenny McCarthy-Wahlberg for Muppet Night.

References

External links

"Rainbow Connection" lyrics
Kermit the Frog Joins National Recording Registry
  Muppet Show  - episode 9, season 5. 
  Story behind the song: Rainbow connection

1979 singles
1979 songs
1970s ballads
The Muppets songs
Pop ballads
Songs written for films
Songs with music by Kenneth Ascher
Songs written by Paul Williams (songwriter)
Film theme songs
Kermit the Frog
Atlantic Records singles
CBS Records singles
United States National Recording Registry recordings